Zhongfang County is a county of Hunan Province, China, it is under the administration of the prefecture-level city of Huaihua.

Located on the west of the province, Zhongfang County is proximately to the city proper of Huaihua. The Yuan River flows through its east part south to north, Wu River runs through its west part north to south. The county is bordered to the northwest by Hecheng District, to the north by Chenxi County, to the east by Xupu County, to the south by Hongjiang City, to the west by Zhijiang County. Zhongfang County has 11 towns and a township under its jurisdiction, the county seat is Zhongfang Town.

References
www.xzqh.org

External links 

 
County-level divisions of Hunan
Huaihua